The 500 Days Program was an ambitious program to overcome the economic crisis in the Soviet Union by means of a transition to a market economy.

History 
The program  was proposed by Grigory Yavlinsky and further developed by a work group under the direction of Stanislav Shatalin (an economic advisor to Mikhail Gorbachev). Before beginning work on the project, Shatalin had been assured by Gorbachev that he was serious about radically reforming the Soviet economy.

Therefore, in August 1990, the group issued a 400-page report titled "Transition to the Market". It was based on the earlier "400 Days Project" prepared by Yavlinsky and became known colloquially as the "500 Days Program" as it intended to create the groundwork for a modern market economy in 500 days.  The report called for creation of a competitive market economy, mass privatization, prices determined by the market, integration with the world economic system, a large transfer of power from the Union government to the Republics, and many other radical reforms.

The 500 Days Program immediately gained the complete support of Boris Yeltsin and a more skeptical support from Mikhail Gorbachev; soon after, Nikolai Ryzhkov, the Chairman of the Council of Ministers, openly repudiated it.

The Supreme Soviet of the Soviet Union delayed in adopting the program, eventually accepting a more moderate program for economic reform, titled: "Basic Guidelines for Stabilization of the Economy and Transition to a Market Economy". The new program contained many measures from the 500-Days Program, but most notably lacked a timetable and did not mention the division of economic power between the Union and Republics.

Authors 
 Stanislav Sergeyovich Shatalin, 
 Nikolai Yakovlevich Petrakov, 
 Grigory Alekseyovich Yavlinsky, 
 Sergey Vladimirovich Aleksashenko, 
 Andrey Petrovich Vavilov, 
 Leonid Markovich Grigoryev, 
 Mikhail Mikhailovich Zadornov, 
 Vladlen Arkadyevich Martynov, 
 Vladimir Mashchits, 
 Aleksey Yuryevich Mikhailov 
 Boris Grigorevich Fyodorov, 
 Tatyana Vladimirovna Yarygina, 
 Yevgeniy Grigorevich Yasin,

See also

References

Works cited

Further reading 
 Shatalov, Sergei. (1991). Privatization in the Soviet Union : the beginnings of a transition.

External links 
 500 Days Program: History & Main points 
 "500 Days": links, chronology, personalia 

Reform in the Soviet Union
Economy of the Soviet Union
1990 in the Soviet Union
Grigory Yavlinsky